Germany at the 2010–2012 European Nations Cup saw a return of the German national rugby union team to the ENC Second Division, having been relegated without a win from the First Division in 2008–2010. The renaming of division within the ENC however meant, that the former Second Division is now named First Division B. The team struggled in the first half of the competition, only winning one of their five games but improved in the second half, when it won three games, to finish fourth overall and well clear of relegation.

Germany faced Belgium, Czech Republic, Moldova, Poland and the Netherlands in a competition that had been enlarged from five to six teams. Germany kicked off its campaign on 20 November 2010, when they played and lost to Poland in Frankfurt am Main, followed by a game against the Netherlands a week later in Amsterdam. The next matches were then played in March and April 2011, when Germany met the remaining three teams. Germany's first game of the autumn campaign in 2011 was against the Netherlands on 12 November 2011, followed by an away game in Poland a week later. The final three games of the competition for Germany were then played in March 2012.

Germany also played, like in the previous year, a friendly against Hong Kong, on 11 December 2010 at Heidelberg.

With the final game against Moldova, Germany's captain Alexander Widiker played his 51st game for his country, thereby equaling Horst Kemmling's record.

Games
Germany suffered a defeat in its opening game of the 2010–2012 European Nations Cup First Division, losing to Poland 17-22 after leading 17-9 at half time. The defeat was seen as unnecessary by the president of the German Rugby Federation, Claus-Peter Bach, but he also considered Poland's victory as deserved. Germany went into the match with a new coach and assistant, a new captain, Alexander Widiker and five uncapped players.

Germany finally achieved its first win in the ENC since 26 April 2008, when it beat the Netherlands in Amsterdam on 27 November 2010. Its last victory in the European competition had come at the same place against the same opposition, just over 31 months earlier. It also won the following game, a friendly against Hong Kong, cementing its position as number 30 in the rugby world ranking. A loss in this game could have meant for Germany a drop as far as to position 37 in the ranking, instead, the country managed to cut down its deficit to 29th placed Ukraine.

Germany began its 2011 spring campaign with an unofficial friendly against a New Zealand Ambassadors XV, made up almost exclusively of players from New Zealand which are active in Germany and the Netherlands. The New Zealand embassy in Germany donated a cup for this match, the Ambassadors Cup.

The first competitive game of 2011, against the Czech Republic in Heidelberg, brought a disappointing 23-29 defeat for the German team. Germany lost the game in the first half, after which the Czech Republic lead 26-13.

The German team continued its 2011 campaign with a third defeat in the third game, against Belgium in Brussels. Belgium lead 28-13 after 59 minutes but Germany clawed back to earn a bonus point in its 25-28 defeat. The fifth game of Germany's ENC campaign also ended in defeat, this time in Moldova, ending all German hopes for promotion and instead condemning the team to struggle against relegation.

In an attempt to improve the performance of the team it was decided to have weekly training sessions for the members of the national team, held at different locations. Germany started with an improved performance in its 2011 autumn campaign, defeating the New Zealand Ambassadors XV 19–17 despite fielding a number of uncapped players, a side it had lost to 19–43 eight month earlier.

The German team nominated eight new, uncapped players for the encounter against the Netherlands on 12 November 2011, which the team won 23–7, thereby making a major step towards avoiding relegation.

In its second game of the 2011 autumn campaign, away against Poland, Germany took an 8–0 lead after 14 minutes but did not score another point after that. Poland scored 34 points after that of which 26 were scored by the Polish No 15, David Chartier.

Germany played three games in three weeks in March 2012 and showed signs of improvement. It won 20-17 away at the Czech Republic, narrowly lost by a point at home to eventual champions Belgium and won its final match, against Moldova, 40-7. Germany played strong first halves in their first two games but was lucky to hang on to its lead in the Czech Republic while, against Belgium, a half time lead of 22-9 was not enough to win the game. In the last game, Germany played its best performance of the campaign while Moldova displayed a weak side.

Management & coaching
After the resignation of Rudolf Finsterer after the final game of the 2008-10 campaign, Bruno Stolorz, under the supervision of Peter Ianusevici, Germany's Director of Rugby, remained in charge of the German team. A final decision on the position was scheduled to be made in a meeting of board of the German Rugby Federation in May 2010 in Hanover. However, no new German coach was announced until July 2010. On 11 July 2010, Torsten Schippe was introduced as the new German coach, with South African Jakobus Potgieter as Schippe's assistant. Schippe had been coach of Germany once before, leading the team from 2000 to 2001.

Mustafa Güngör, who served as the captain of the German team since December 2009 was replaced by Alexander Widiker before the first match of the campaign. Pieter Jordaan was also confirmed as the new vice-captain of the German team.

Debuts and retirements
Four players made their debut in Germany's first game of the campaign, against Poland, those being Arthur Zeiler, Sven Wetzel, Tim Menzel and James Keinhorst. Two more uncapped players, vice-captain Pieter Jordaan, who missed the game due to injury but hoped to play in the following game against the Netherlands and Dustin Eaton, who was part of the wider squad but not selected for the game, were originally also part of the squad.

With Jordaan in the starting line-up against the Netherlands as well as Sam Henderson, Germany fielded two more debutants in its second ENC game. Jordaan however was injured just before kick-off, during the warm-up, and had to be substituted. Nico Kanning was part of the squad as a substitute, being the third uncapped player in the line-up, and was substituted in during the game, receiving his first cap.

In the friendly against Hong Kong, Bastian Himmer made his debut and scored his first international try, while another debutant, Jannis Läpple, came on as a substitute.

Daniel Armitage made his debut for Germany against the Czech Republic in the first competitive game of 2011.

After a number of failed attempts, Pieter Jordaan finally made his debut for Germany against Belgium, where he scored two tries but was unable to prevent another defeat. In the game against Moldova, Gilles Valette and Felix Bayer made their debut for Germany.

For its first game of the return round of the ENC in November 2011 against the Netherlands, Germany nominated eight uncapped players, those being Rob May, Sean Armstrong, Callum Sauer, Olivier Galli, Raynor Parkinson, Guillaume Kasdorf, Mika Tyumenev und Stéphane Kohler. Of those, Kohler, Sauer, May, Armstrong, Parkinson and Galli were in the starting line-up while Kasdorf and Tyumenev were not fielded in the game.

Mika Tyumenev and Carlos Soteras-Merz made their debut for Germany against Poland in November 2011.

In the first game in March 2012, Benjamin Strappazon and Kieran Manawatu made their debut for Germany, while Chris Hilsenbeck made his in the second game and was the last player to make his debut in this campaign.

Table
The final table:

Games

Friendlies

The two games against the New Zealand Ambassadors XV are not official international tests, no caps were awarded and matches were not counted in statistics

ENC matches

Player statistics

Squad
The following players are part of the German team during its 2010-12 campaign:

 Clubs listed are the club or clubs a player played for while playing for Germany in 2010-12, not current club.

Games
The following players have been selected for Germany from 2010 to 2012 in the country's European Nation Cup campaign and in friendlies:

 Bold numbers indicate player played in the game.
 Italics indicates did not play.
  denotes substituted off.
  denotes substituted on.
 (c) denotes captain.
  denotes sin bin.
 Germany had only 21 players available for the game against the Netherlands on 27 November 2010, because Pieter Jordaan injured himself during the warm-up.

Scorers

ENC

Try scorers

Points scorers

Friendlies
Matches against the New Zealand Ambassadors XV not included

Try scorers

Points scorers

References

External links
 Deutscher Rugby-Verband - Official Site of the German Rugby Federation
 TotalRugby.de German rugby website with news and results
FIRA-AER website

2010-12
2010–11 in German rugby union
2011–12 in German rugby union